Vereniging tot Behoud van Natuurmonumenten in Nederland, also known as Vereniging Natuurmonumenten, is a Dutch nature conservation organization founded in 1905 by Jacobus Pieter Thijsse and Eli Heimans, that buys, protects, and manages nature reserves in the Netherlands. It is a member of the European Environmental Bureau.

The first area that the organization purchased in 1905 was to protect the Naardermeer, southeast of Amsterdam. The largest is De Wieden; the smallest is Fort Ellewoutsdijk.

The organization also owns 1,700 buildings, of which 250 were provincial or national monuments. In 2013, the organization had 735,000 members and was headquartered in 's-Graveland.

The organization was awarded the Gouden Ganzenveer in 1986.

References

External links 

  

1905 establishments in the Netherlands
Environmental organisations based in the Netherlands
Environmental organizations established in 1905
Nature conservation organisations based in Europe